Charles Lanaway (16 March 1793 at Henfield, Sussex – 6 February 1870 at Brighton) was an English professional cricketer who played first-class cricket from 1825 to 1838.

A right-handed batsman and underarm bowler who was mainly associated with Sussex, he made 36 known appearances in first-class matches.  He represented the Players in the Gentlemen v Players series.

References

External links

Further reading
 Arthur Haygarth, Scores & Biographies, Volumes 1-2 (1744–1840), Lillywhite, 1862

1793 births
1870 deaths
English cricketers
English cricketers of 1787 to 1825
English cricketers of 1826 to 1863
Players cricketers
Sussex cricketers
People from Henfield